Randy Monroe''' (born April 22, 1962) is an American college basketball coach. He is currently an assistant coach at Thomas Jefferson University in Philadelphia, Pennsylvania. He is also the assistant dean of students at St. Joseph's Preparatory School, and formerly served as the school's assistant boys basketball coach.  Monroe served as the head men's basketball coach at the University of Maryland, Baltimore County from 2004 to 2012. He played college basketball at Philadelphia University and Cheyney University of Pennsylvania.

Head coaching record

College

References

1962 births
Living people
American men's basketball coaches
American men's basketball players
Basketball coaches from Pennsylvania
Basketball players from Philadelphia
Cheyney Wolves men's basketball coaches
Cheyney Wolves men's basketball players
College men's basketball head coaches in the United States
High school basketball coaches in the United States
La Salle Explorers men's basketball coaches
Philadelphia Rams men's basketball players
UMBC Retrievers men's basketball coaches
Vanderbilt Commodores men's basketball coaches